Yuzhnoye (Cherbuzinskoye) Cemetery is a cemetery in the Sovetsky City District of Novosibirsk, Russia.

Notable people buried at the Yuzhnoye Cemetery
 Dmitry Belyayev, Soviet geneticist, director of the Institute of Cytology and Genetics from 1959 to 1985. (see also Domesticated red fox)
 Gersh Budker, Soviet physicist, specialized in nuclear physics and accelerator physics, founder and first Director of the Institute of Nuclear Physics
 Andrey Ershov, Soviet computer scientist, pioneer in systems programming and programming language research
 Valentin Koptyug, Russian chemist
 Samson Kutateladze, Soviet heat physicist and hydrodynamicist
 Mikhail Lavrentyev, Soviet mathematician and hydrodynamist, one of the founders of the Siberian Branch of the Russian Academy of Sciences (SBRAS)
 Anatoly Maltsev, Soviet mathematician (see also Malcev algebra)
 Alexey Okladnikov, Soviet archaeologist, historian, and ethnographer
 Yuri Rumer, Soviet theoretical physicist, who worked in the fields of quantum mechanics and quantum optics

Gallery

External links
 Места на Южном кладбище заканчиваются. Академия Новостей. 
 Чербусы на Арбузова. Академия Новостей. 
 Могилы знаменитостей. Беляев Дмитрий Константинович. 

Cemeteries in Novosibirsk
Sovetsky District, Novosibirsk